The Lega Alta Italia (Italian for High Italy League) was the ruling body of the major football championships during the US military occupation of Northern Italy.

History
The Higher Directory, the football committee during the fascist age, was disbanded at the arrival of the US Army in 1945. Railways and routes disruptions, together with the Allied occupation the industrialized North, had divided Italy in two parts. Sport consequently restarted under a special transitional season.

Clubs from Northern Italy restored a free football league after 19 years of fascist rule. It organized the local section of the Serie A, whose best teams would join a final national phase, while the Serie B clubs were united with the best Serie C teams.

The league organized also a local post season cup which was won by Bologna FC.

The situation changed a year after the end of World War II. The national Lega Calcio was created in its place in 1946.

Chairman
1945-1946 Pietro Pedroni

See also
 Italian football league system
 Serie A
 AMGOT

References

Serie A
Serie B
Serie C
1946 disestablishments in Italy
Football governing bodies in Italy
1945 establishments in Italy